James Leslie John Woodhead, OBE (born 1937) is a British documentary filmmaker.

For his National Service commencing in 1956, he served in Fife at the Joint Services School for Linguists where he was taught Russian. He was posted to West Berlin to monitor the communications of Soviet pilots flying in and out of East Germany. "The experience I've come to realise since that it shaped my continuing obsession with what was going on in eastern Europe and particularly the Iron Curtain at that time."

As a young filmmaker, he was assigned to film a new rock 'n' roll band called The Beatles, playing at the Cavern Club in Liverpool. Woodhead first made his name as a reporter for Granada Television's flagship current affairs series World in Action. He remained with Granada for 28 years. Woodhead was among the first exponents of docudrama, a format which allowed him to explore daily life of those "behind the wall" during the Cold War, when journalists had little direct access. Among these were his films Invasion, about Soviet invasion and the Prague Spring of 1968, and Strike which deals with the rise of  Solidarność in Poland. In 1999 his documentary film A Cry From The Grave, which documents, hour by hour, the atrocities of the Srebrenica massacre, won awards at four film festivals.

Woodhead went freelance in 1989. Since then, he has made a number of films for BBC's Storyville and Arena series – among them My Life as a Spy, Star Wars Dreams (a history of the American missile defence program). He has also worked with the Sundance channel, making Godless in America, a documentary about the life of Madalyn Murray O'Hair who founded American Atheists and successfully campaigned for the separation of church and state. He was appointed an OBE for services to television in 1994. In 2006, he was nominated for an Emmy for his HBO documentary Children of Beslan about the Beslan school hostage crisis.

Recent filmography
2019 Ella Fitzgerald: Just One of Those Things (Director)
2013 The Day Kennedy Died (Writer/Director)
2012 The Hunt for Bin Laden (Writer/Director)
2011 9/11: The Day that Changed the World (Director/Producer)
2009 How the Beatles Rocked the Kremlin (Director)
2006 Saving Jazz (Director)	
2005 Children of Beslan (Director/Producer)
2004 The Russian Newspaper Murders (Executive Producer)
2003 Star Wars Dreams (Director/Producer)
2002 Media by Milosevic (Director)	
2001 NOVA: Russia's Nuclear Warriors (Director/Producer/Screenwriter)
2000 Tony Bennett's New York (Director/Producer)
2000 NOVA: Holocaust on Trial (Director/Screenwriter)
1998 Endurance (Director)
1991 The Tragedy of Flight 103: The Inside Story (Director)

Awards and nominations
1974: BAFTA nomination for Factual Programme for The Year Of The Torturer
1986: BAFTA Desmond Davis Award
1994: OBE for services to television
1999: Biarritz International Festival Special Jury Award for A Cry from the Grave
2000: Silver FIPA award for A Cry from the Grave
2006: Emmy nomination for Outstanding Directing for Nonfiction Programming for Children of Beslan, BAFTA nomination for Flaherty Documentary Award for Children of Beslan
2012: Lifetime Achievement Award at the Aldeburgh Documentary Festival, BAFTA nomination for Single Documentary for 9/11: The Day That Changed The World
2014: BAFTA nomination for Single Documentary for The Day Kennedy Died

References

External links 

English documentary filmmakers
Living people
Officers of the Order of the British Empire
1937 births